St Alban's, Cheam, also known as the Church of St Alban the Martyr, is one of three Church of England churches in the parish of Cheam in the London Borough of Sutton.

It was founded in 1930 and, inspired by the building of a barn church in North Sheen (now incorporated into Kew), was constructed using materials from the farmhouse, barns and other outbuildings at Cheam Court Farm, which may have been connected with Henry VIII's Nonsuch Palace. Edward Swan, the Barn Church's architect, was also commissioned  as one of the architects for the new church at Cheam.

Activities
The church has a service of worship on Sundays at 10.30 am and a weekday Eucharist at 10:00 am on Wednesdays.  Evensong is at 6:00 pm on the 1st Sunday of the month.

Communications
The parish publishes a weekly newsletter, The Week.

See also
The Barn Church, Kew
Barn Church, Culloden
Barn Church (Michigan)

Gallery

References

External links
 website

1930 establishments in England
20th-century Church of England church buildings
Cheam
Barns in England
Cheam
Churches completed in 1930
Churches in the London Borough of Sutton